The 1988 Belgian motorcycle Grand Prix was the ninth round of the 1988 Grand Prix motorcycle racing season. It took place on the weekend of 1–3 July 1988 at Spa-Francorchamps.

500 cc race report
Wet track (but it was not raining).

Christian Sarron on pole, and through the first turn it was Wayne Gardner, Kevin Schwantz, Eddie Lawson, et al.

Gardner got a gap from Lawson, Sarron, Schwantz, Wayne Rainey, Pierfrancesco Chili, Didier De Radiguès and Ron Haslam.

Sarron through to 2nd and was catching Gardner.

Randy Mamola moved past Rainey and De Radiguès to get to 4th behind Schwantz.

Sarron touched a white line and slid out of 2nd, putting Lawson behind Gardner. Schwantz crashed out of 4th as De Radiguès and Rainey went by; he tried to get up but looked like he injured his left leg.

500 cc classification

References

Belgian motorcycle Grand Prix
Belgian
Motorcycle Grand Prix
Belgian motorcycle Grand Prix